In 4-dimensional geometry, the dodecahedral cupola is a polychoron bounded by a rhombicosidodecahedron, a parallel dodecahedron, connected by 30 triangular prisms, 12 pentagonal prisms, and 20 tetrahedra.

Related polytopes
The dodecahedral cupola can be sliced off from a runcinated 120-cell, on a hyperplane parallel to a dodecahedral cell. The cupola can be seen in a pentagonal centered orthogonal projection of the runcinated 120-cell:

See also 
 Dodecahedral pyramid

References

External links
 Segmentochora:  doe || srid  

4-polytopes
Four-dimensional geometry